Piperlonguminine is a alkaloid amide isolated from Piper longum.

References

Benzodioxoles
Amides